Yeliz Açar (born 19 December 1997) is a Turkish-born Azerbaijani footballer who plays as a forward for Kadınlar 1. Ligi club Fatih Vatan Spor  and the Azerbaijan women's national team. She has been a member of the Turkey women's national under-17 football team, and later of the Azerbaijan national team.

Club career 

Açar obtained her license from Zeytinburnu Spor on 19 March 2010. She made her debut in the 2011–12 Women's Second League season for Istanbul Nurçelik Spor, which was renamed the next season Akdeniz Nurçelik Spor. She then signed with Lüleburgaz 39 Spor in September 2013. However, her club withdrew from the league, and according to the Turkish Football Federation's regulation, she was not allowed to transfer to any other club in the 2013–14 season. In the second half of that season, she moved to Kdz. Ereğlispor to play in the 2013–14 Women's First League. After a brief appearance in Karadeniz Ereğli, she returned to Istanbul and joined Beşiktaş J.K. in the Turkish Women's Third Football League. At the end of the 2014–15 season, she enjoyed her team's promotion to the Women's Second League, and the next season her team's promotion to the Women's First League. After three seasons, she signed with Fatih Vatan Spor to play in the 2017–18 Women's First league.

International career

Turkey 
Açar was a member of the Turkey girls' U-17 team in a friendly match against Switzerland in March 2013.

Azerbaijan 
Açar became a member of the Azerbaijan women's national football team. Açar played in three matches of the UEFA Women's Euro 2022 qualifying Group D, and three matches of the 2023 FIFA Women's World Cup qualification – UEFA Group E.

Career statistics 
.

Honours 
Turkish Women's First Football League
 Beşiktaş J.K.
 Runners-up (1): 2016–17

 Fatih Vatan Spor
 Runners-up /1): 2020–21

Turkish Women's Second Football League
 Beşiktaş J.K.
 Winners (1): 2015–16

Turkish Women's Third Football League
 Beşiktaş J.K.
 Winners (1): 2014–15

See also 
List of Azerbaijan women's international footballers

References 

1997 births
Living people
Citizens of Azerbaijan through descent
Azerbaijani women's footballers
Women's association football forwards
Azerbaijan women's international footballers
Azerbaijani people of Turkish descent
People from Fatih
Footballers from Istanbul
Turkish women's footballers
Karadeniz Ereğlispor players
Beşiktaş J.K. women's football players
Fatih Vatan Spor players
Akdeniz Nurçelik Spor players
Turkish Women's Football Super League players
Turkish people of Azerbaijani descent
Sportspeople of Azerbaijani descent